The Mattawoman (also known as Mattawomen) were a group of Native Americans living along the Western Shore of Maryland on the Chesapeake Bay at the time of English colonization.  They lived along Mattawoman Creek in present-day Charles County, Maryland.  They were also recorded in the early 17th century by explorer John Smith at Quantico Creek in Prince William County, Virginia.  He called them Pamacocack.

One of the Algonquian language-speaking coastal tribes, the Mattawomen survived in the Chesapeake Bay area until 1735. They were under the loose domination of the paramount chiefdom of the Piscataway, also an Algonquian-language tribe.

Relations with Maryland 
The Mattawomans had a cordial relationship with the Maryland government. They were once armed, along with the Piscataways and Pamunkeys, with "matchcoats, corn, powder, and shot in return for military help.”  Being distrustful of Natives, the Maryland government wanted to ensure loyalty from the Mattawomans.  However, relations were not always peaceful because Maryland also took hostages then employed the help of the Mattawomans to translate during interrogations.

Notes

References 
Maryland: A Colonial History, p. 22

Eastern Algonquian peoples
Extinct Native American tribes
Indigenous peoples of the Northeastern Woodlands
Native American history of Maryland
Piscataway tribe
Native American tribes in Maryland
Chesapeake Bay